Neuromancer is an adventure video game developed by Interplay Productions and published by Mediagenic (a brand name that Activision was also known by). It was released in 1988 for the Amiga, Apple II, Apple IIGS, Commodore 64, and MS-DOS. It was loosely based on William Gibson's 1984 novel of the same name and set within both the fictional "real world" and the extensively realized and detailed world of cyberspace. It has a soundtrack based on the Devo song "Some Things Never Change" from their album Total Devo. Writer Timothy Leary had sub-contracted the rights to a video game adaptation of the novel, and eventually brought the project to Interplay to develop.

Gameplay
The gameplay was split between a traditional adventure setting, where a player could interact with "real world" inhabitants within Chiba City, and a 3D grid representation of cyberspace once he'd managed to regain access. Different "real world" locations led to different grid sectors, thus developing the plot and enriching the immersion.

Cyberspace combat was also simulated in the game as the player attempted to breach ICE (Intrusion Countermeasure Electronics) to gain entry to database nodes and potentially face the formidable AIs (Artificial Intelligences) that hide behind them. "Combat" with ICE consisted of the ICE and the player doing damage to each other (the former through a built-in attack form, the latter based on what programs the player ran; some programs did one-time damage, some did damage over time for a while, and some had other effects such as slowing down the ICE) until either the ICE "cracked" or the player was kicked out of cyberspace. Combat with AIs was similar, except that AIs were damaged primarily with skills rather than programs; were invulnerable until hit at least once with a specific skill or program; and the result of "losing" was character death. Neuromancer was somewhat forgiving of even "death", as a deceased character would be reanimated for the price of whatever money was in his credit chip at the time of death - although remaining logged into cyberspace at some points required credit payment.

Skills and abilities can be purchased as "skill chips" that can be used in a brain jack implanted in the protagonist's head, giving him an edge in a variety of situations. Skills could also increase with successful completion of a difficult task.

The game also used a code wheel as a form of copy protection. The code wheel was necessary to access the PAX terminals in the game at certain points and without it the player hits a dead-end in the plot.

Plot
The game is loosely based on the events of the novel Neuromancer by William Gibson. Locations, characters, items and nuances of cyberspace from the novel appear.

Taking place in the year 2058 in Chiba, Japan, the plot centered on the protagonist attempting to discover the truth behind the mysterious disappearances of his friends as well as other, less friendly cyberspace cowboys. Unfortunately, the player's character has fallen on hard times and has had to pawn his cyberspace deck. He awakes in a plate of Ratz' famous spaghetti, and the first order of business is to find some way to retrieve his old deck from the nearby pawnshop.

After obtaining the deck and upgrading the software to enable cyberspace access, the character finds that users of the Matrix are being killed or flatlined by a group of AIs led by a renegade named Greystoke. After destroying Greystoke, the player meets Neuromancer who explains that he has manipulated the player into killing the other AIs, and traps him on a virtual island (as in the ending of the book). However, the player can use their skills to escape and destroy Neuromancer, making the Matrix safe again.

Some other aspects of the book are included in the game as red herrings. For example, the character Armitage can contact the player at one point, but if the player accepts his mission, he and Armitage are immediately arrested.

Reception

Computer Gaming World gave Neuromancer a very favorable review, citing the game's pacing and wit, as well as the use of Gibson's setting. Combat was also praised, as was the reward of information for winning combat. The only complaints it had about the game were the predetermined responses in conversation, and the excessive use of disk swapping. The magazine awarded it a title of "Adventure Game of the Year", and in 1996 included it on lists of the "150 Best Games of All Time" and "15 best ways to die in computer gaming". Compute! also favorably reviewed the game, citing the graphics, user interface, and the Devo soundtrack, and only criticizing the "adolescent jokes". The magazine named the game to its list of "nine great games for 1989". In 2004, Neuromancer was inducted into GameSpot's list of the greatest games of all time.

Reviews
Challenge #42 (1990)

References

External links
 Neuromancer at Hall of Light Amiga database
 
 
 Images of Neuromancer C64 package, manual and screen shots

1988 video games
Activision games
Adventure games
Amiga games
Apple II games
Apple IIGS games
Commodore 64 games
Cyberpunk video games
DOS games
Electronic Arts games
Interplay Entertainment games
Video games based on novels
Video games developed in the United States
Video games scored by Barry Leitch
Video games set in Japan
Video games set in the 2050s
William Gibson